Benjamin Keach (29 February 1640 – 18 July 1704) was a Particular Baptist preacher and author in London whose name was given to Keach's Catechism.

Biography
Originally from Buckinghamshire, Keach worked as a tailor during his early years. He was baptized at the age of 15 and began preaching at 18. He was the minister of the congregation at Winslow before moving in 1668 to the church at Horsleydown (Horse-lie-down), Southwark where he remained for 36 years as pastor (1668-1704). (This congregation later became the New Park Street Church and then moved to the Metropolitan Tabernacle under the pastorship of Charles Spurgeon.)

It was as representative of this church that Keach went to the 1689 General Assembly and subscribed the 1689 London Baptist Confession of Faith. Keach was one of the seven men who sent out the invitation to the 1689 General Assembly. The signing of the confession was no mute doctrinal assent on the part of the church, for in the same year they entered into a Solemn Covenant which reflected, at the practical and congregational level, some of the doctrines of the confession. There was a secession from Horse-lie-down in 1673 and the Old Kent Road congregation was formed. Spurgeon later republished the 1689 London Baptist Confession of Faith for use in the congregation.

Keach wrote 43 works, of which his "Parables and Metaphors of Scripture" may be the best known. He wrote a work entitled "The Child's Instructor" which immediately brought him under persecution and he was fined and pilloried in 1664. He is attributed with the writing of a catechism commonly known as "Keach's Catechism", although it is most likely that the original was compiled by William Collins.

Keach is also known to have promoted the introduction of hymn singing in the Baptist churches.
  His church, Horslydown, was probably the first church in England to sing hymns, as opposed to psalms and paraphrases. Keach's hymnbook, published in 1691, provoked heated debate in the 1692 Assembly of Particular Baptists.

Among his eschatological convictions, Keach anticipated a major revival amongst the Jews at the end of this age.

Works
The Glory of a True Church, and Its Discipline Display’d, London: John Robinson (1697)
The Progress of Sin, Or the Travels of Ungodliness, London: J. Clarke (5th edition, 1736)
The Travels of True Godliness, Boston: Lincoln & Edmands (Revised and Improved, 1831) 
Gold Refin’d, or, Baptism in Its Primitive Purity, London: Printed for the author. (1689)
An Exposition of the Parables and Express Similitudes of Our Lord and Saviour Jesus Christ, London: Aylott and Co. (1858)
Spiritual Songs: Being the Marrow of the Scripture, in Songs of Praise to Almighty God; From the Old and New Testament, London: John Marshal (Second Edition, 1700)
The Baptist Catechism, Commonly Called Keach’s Catechism: Or, a Brief Instruction in the Principles of the Christian Religion, Philadelphia: American Baptist Publication Society. (1851)
Tropologia: A Key to Open Scripture Metaphors, London: William Hill Collingridge (1856)
The Marrow of True Justification, or, Justification without Works London: Dorman Newman (1692)
War with the Devil; or the Young Man’s Conflict with the Powers of Darkness; Displayed in a Poetical Dialogue between Youth and Conscience Coventry: T. Luckman. (n.d.)
The Scriptures Superior to All Spiritual Manifestations. In H. C. Fish (Ed.), History and Repository of Pulpit Eloquence, Deceased Divines, Containing the Masterpieces (Vol. I), New York: Dodd, Mead & Company. (1856)
A Golden Mine Opened: Or, the Glory of God’s Rich Grace Displayed in the Mediator to Believers: And His Direful Wrath against Impenitent Sinners: Containing the Substance of near Forty Sermons upon Several Subjects, London: Printed for the author (1694)

References

 Brackney, William H. (2004). A Genetic History of Baptist Thought: With Special Reference to Baptists in Britain and North America. Macon, GA: Mercer University Press. pp. 33, 66–68, 74, 105, 116–117.

External links
Information on Benjamin Keach at the Christian History Institute
A quotation from Keach's The Child's Instructor, 'the first Baptist textbook'
Recent Scholarship on Keach Available Online at The Benjamin Keach Journal
 

1640 births
1704 deaths
People from Buckinghamshire
Evangelists
Christian writers
17th-century English Baptist ministers
English Calvinist and Reformed Christians
English Baptist theologians
British sermon writers
18th-century English Baptist ministers